The 2012–13 Hong Kong Reserve Division League was the fifty-fifth season since the establishment of the Hong Kong Reserve Division League.

The events in the senior league during the 2011–12 season saw Sham Shui Po and Hong Kong Sapling relegated and replaced by Southern and Yokohama FC Hong Kong. Each First Division teams will participate in the reserve division league, and play the teams in the league home and away, making a total of 18 matches played for each team.

League table

Updated to games played on 15 May 2013
Source:  Reserve Division Score Table
Rules for classification: 1) points; 2) head-to-head points; 3) head-to-head goal difference; 4) head-to-head goals scored; 5) goal difference; 6) number of goals scored.
(C) = Champion; (R) = Relegated; (P) = Promoted; (O) = Play-off winner; (A) = Advances to a further round.
Only applicable when the season is not finished:
(Q) = Qualified to the phase of tournament indicated; (TQ) = Qualified to tournament, but not yet to the particular phase indicated; (DQ) = Disqualified from tournament.
Head-to-Head: used when head-to-head record is used to rank tied teams.

Results table

Updated to games played on 15 May 2013
Source: Fixtures - Reserve Division
1 The home team is listed in the left-hand column.
Colours: Blue = home team win; Yellow = draw; Red = away team win.
For coming matches, an indicates there is an article about the match.

Fixtures and results

Week 1

1Since Yokohama FC Hong Kong Reserves breached the rule of game, the Hong Kong Football Association awarded Biu Chun Rangers Reserves a 3–0 win. The match ended 5–3 to Biu Chun Rangers.

Week 2

Week 3

Week 4

Week 5

Week 6

Week 7

Week 8

Week 9

Week 10

Week 11

Week 12

Week 13

Week 14

Week 15

Week 16

Week 17

Week 18

Goal scorers

See also
 2012–13 Hong Kong First Division League
 2012–13 in Hong Kong football

References

Reserve
Hong Kong Reserve Division League